Anselmo Moreno (born 28 June 1985) is a Panamanian professional boxer. He held the WBA bantamweight title from 2008 to 2014 (promoted to super champion status in 2011), making him the longest reigning bantamweight world champion of all time, and challenged once for the WBC super bantamweight title in 2012. Nicknamed El Fantasma ("The Phantom"), Moreno is known for his excellent defensive skills and technical fighting style.

Professional career

Early career

Super-flyweight
Moreno made his professional debut against Hussein Sanchez on 10 March 2002. He won the fight by unanimous decision. Moreno amassed a 10–1–1 record during the next three years, with three stoppage victories, before being scheduled to face Ricardo Molina for the vacant WBA Fedecentro super flyweight title on 28 January 2005. He won the fight by a ninth-round technical knockout. The two fought an immediate rematch on 20 August 2005, with the WBA Fedecentro and Panamian super-flyweight titles on the line. Moreno won the fight by unanimous decision.

Move to bantamweight
Moreno moved up to bantamweight for the next fight, as he faced Yogli Herrera on 21 March 2006. He won the fight by unanimous decision, with scores of 100–89, 100–89 and 99–89. Herrera was deducted two points for illegal blows, once in the fourth and once in the eight round. Moreno was next scheduled to face Félix Machado for the vacant WBA Fedecentro and WBA Fedebol bantamweight titles on 5 May 2006, his first title fight at a new weight. He won the fight by unanimous decision, with scores of 98–91, 97–94 and 99–91. Machado was deducted a point in the sixth round for an illegal blow. After a quick fifth-round technical knockout of Jose de Jesus Lopez on 5 August 2006, Moreno was booked to make his first title defense against Franklin Varela on 2 September 2006. He won the fight by unanimous decision, with scores of 98–92, 100–90 and 99–91.

After beating the overmatched Eduardo Pacheco by technical knockout on 7 December 2006, Moreno was booked to fight Nestor Hugo Paniagua for the vacant WBA Fedecaribe bantamweight title on 3 February 2007. He won the fight by unanimous decision, with scores of 100–89, 100–90 and 100–88. Moreno made the first defense of his newly acquired regional title against Tomás Rojas on 2 June 2007. He won the fight by unanimous decision, with scores of 98–92, 99–92 and 98–94. Moreno made his second and final title defense against Ricardo Vargas on 16 August 2007, whom he beat by a first-round technical knockout.

WBA bantamweight champion
Moreno was rewarded for his run of victories by being scheduled to challenge the reigning WBA bantamweight champion Volodymyr Sydorenko. The title fight was booked as the main event of a 31 May 2008, ZDF broadcast card, which took place at the Burg-Wächter Castello in Düsseldorf, Germany. Moreno won the fight by split decision. Two of the judges scored the fight 115–113 for him, while the third judge awarded the same scorecard to Sydorenko.

Moreno made his second title defense against Rolly Matsushita on 30 October 2008, at the Figali Convention Center in Panama City, Panama. He won the fight by unanimous decision, with scores of 119–109, 118–110 and 120–108. Moreno fought a rematch with Volodymyr Sydorenko in his third WBA title defense. The fight was scheduled for 2 May 2009, at the Halle 7 in Bremen, Germany, and was once again broadcast by ZDF. Although the bout was closer than their first meeting, Moreno was once again victorious. He won the fight by split decision, with scores of 115–113, 115–113 and 113–115. Moreno made his third title defense against Mahyar Monshipour on 4 July 2009, at the Parc des Expositions in Poitiers, France. Moreno once again won the fight by split decision, with scores of 116–112, 113–115 and 116–113.

After beating Jorge Otero by a sixth-round technical knockout on 9 October 2009, Moreno was booked to make his fourth title defense against Frédéric Patrac on 4 December 2009, at the Palais des Sports in Agde, France. He won the fight by a later eleventh-round technical knockout, stopping Patrac with four seconds to spare. More made his fifth WBA Regular title defense against the undefeated interim-champion Nehomar Cermeño on 27 March 2010, at the Polideportivo José María Vargas in La Guaira, Venezuela. He won the fight by split decision. Two judges scored the fight 114–113 and 115–112 for the reigning champion, while the third judge scored it 115–112 for the challenger. The pair fought an immediate rematch on 14 August 2010, with the bout taking place in the champion's native Panama this time around. More again won the fight by split decision.

Moreno, who had at that point been promoted to the status of WBA "Super" bantamweight champion, made the first defense of the Super title against Lorenzo Parra at the Roberto Durán Arena in Panama City, Panama. He had no trouble with the challenger, who retired from the bout at the end of the eight round. Moreno was booked to make his second title defense against Vic Darchinyan on 3 December 2011. The fight presented Moreno's United States debut, as it took place at the Honda Center in Anaheim, California. He won the fight unanimous decision, with scores of 120–107, 117–110 and 116–111. Moreno made his third title defense against David de la Mora on 12 April 2012. He won the fight by a ninth-round technical knockout.

Moreno moved up in weight to super bantamweight for his next bout, in order to challenge the reigning WBC champion Abner Mares. The title fight was scheduled as the event headliner of the 10 November 2012 Showtime card, which took place at the Staples Center in Los Angeles, California. Mares won the fight by unanimous decision, with two judges scoring the fight 116–110 in his favor, while the third judge awarded him a wider scorecard of 120–106. Moreno was knocked down in the fifth round, and was deducted a point in the eleventh round for pulling down the head of Mares.

Moreno then returned to bantamweight, in order to make his fourth WBA Super title defense. Their fight was booked for 10 August 2013, at the Megapolis Convention Center in Panama City, Panama. He won the fight by unanimous decision, with two judges scoring the fight 118–110 for him, while the third judge scored it 116–112 for Moreno. Moreno made his fifth title defense against Javier Nicolas Chacon on 22 March 2014. He won the fight by unanimous decision.

Moreno was booked to make his sixth title defense against Juan Carlos Payano. The fight took place on 26 September 2014, at the Mesquite Arena in Mesquite, Texas, and was broadcast by Fox Sports. The fight was stopped in the sixth round, due to a cut which was caused by an accidental clash of heads in the second round, and which worsened as the bout went on. Payano was awarded the technical decision, with scores of 59–55, 58–56 and 58–55.

Later career
Moreno returned to competition a year later, in order to challenge the reigning WBC bantamweight champion Shinsuke Yamanaka. The fight took place at the Ota City General Gymnasium in Tokyo, Japan on 22 September 2015. Yamanaka won the fight by a narrow split decision. All three judges scored the fight 115–113, with two of them scoring it in favor of Yamanaka and the third in favor of Moreno. After suffering his fourth professional loss, Moreno faced the former WBC super flyweight champion Suriyan Sor Rungvisai on 1 May 2016. He won the fight by unanimous decision, with scores of 117–110, 116–111 and 117–110. After successfully bouncing back, Moreno was booked to rematch the WBC bantamweight champion Shinsuke Yamanaka on 16 September 2016. Aside from the WBC title, the vacant The Ring title was on the line as well. Yamanaka was more convincing in the rematch, winning the fight by a seventh-round technical knockout.

Moreno then returned to super bantamweight, to fight Julio Ceja for the vacant WBC Silver super bantamweight title on 27 May 2017. Ceja won the fight by a quick third-round knockout. On 3 June 2017, Moreno officially announced his retirement from the sport, after suffering his fourth loss in his previous five fights.

Move to featherweight
On 9 April 2019, it was revealed that Moreno would return from retirement and beginning competing at featherweight. Moreno was booked to face Daniel Colula on 30 April 2019, following a 23 month absence from the sport. He won the fight by unanimous decision, with scores of 79–72, 77–74 and 78–73. Moreno was next booked to face Luis Nino on 27 November 2019. He won by an eight-round disqualification. Referee Ivan Ballesteros disqualified Nino for an evident low blow.

Moreno faced Ruben Tostado Garcia for the vacant WBA Fedelatin featherweight title on 21 May 2021. He won the fight by unanimous decision, with scores of 100–90, 96–94 and 100–90. Moreno made his first title defense against Walberto Ramos on 15 October 2021. He won the fight by a first-round knockout. Moreno was booked to make his second WBA Fedelatin title defense against Gustavo Pina Melgar on 12 March 2022. He won the fight by a tenth-round technical knockout. Moreno faced Julio Cesar Cruz Avendano on 15 October 2022, in his second and final professional appearance of the year. He won the fight by a first-round knockout.

Professional boxing record

References

External links

Anselmo Moreno - Profile, News Archive & Current Rankings at Box.Live

1985 births
Living people
World Boxing Association champions
Bantamweight boxers
Southpaw boxers
Panamanian male boxers
Super-flyweight boxers
Super-bantamweight boxers
World bantamweight boxing champions